Amblycorypha uhleri, known generally as the Uhler's virtuoso katydid or Uhler's katydid, is a species of phaneropterine katydid in the family Tettigoniidae. It is found in North America.

References

Phaneropterinae
Articles created by Qbugbot
Insects described in 1876